Karin Ingrid Andrea Lindblad (born 11 April 2000) is a Swedish amateur golfer. She won the 2021 European Ladies Amateur and rose to number 2 in the World Amateur Golf Ranking in August 2020. In 2022, she set the amateur 18-hole scoring record at the U.S. Women's Open posting a six-under 65 and was part of the Swedish team winning the Espirito Santo Trophy.

Career
Lindblad grew up in Halmstad and joined the Swedish National Team in 2017. She represented her country at the European Girls' Team Championship, were Sweden won the bronze in 2018. She was then part of the Swedish teams that won the European Ladies' Team Championship in 2019 and 2020, teamed with Frida Kinhult, Sara Kjellker, Maja Stark, Linn Grant, and Beatrice Wallin. She was a member of the 2018 European Junior Ryder Cup team and was selected for the international team at the 2020 Arnold Palmer Cup and again at the 2021 Arnold Palmer Cup.

She also excelled individually. In 2017 she won the Irish Girls U18 Open Stroke Play Championship, the Stenson Sunesson Junior Challenge and the Swedish Junior Classics. In 2018 she won the German Girls Open. She was runner-up at the 2018 Annika Invitational Europe and won the 2019 Annika Invitational USA. In 2019, Lindblad qualified for the 2019 Women's British Open, her first major championship, where she fell short of the cut.

Lindblad was a freshman at Louisiana State University in 2019–20, following in the footsteps of compatriot Madelene Sagström. In her freshman year, she had the best single season scoring average in LSU women's golf history at 70.33, beating Sagström's previous record of 71.48 from 2014–15. She won two individual tournaments, the Magnolia Invitational and the Florida State Match-Up, in her pandemic-shortened freshman season. Lindblad became the first player in program history to earn Southeastern Conference Player of the Year and Freshman of the Year honors in the same season.

Over the summer in 2020, she played on the Nordic Golf Tour where she won the Golfhäftet Masters after a playoff with Beatrice Wallin. She then won the Skaftö Open, prevailing in a playoff against Wallin and Linn Grant. With the wins, Lindblad earned a runner-up position behind Grant in the Nordic Golf Tour 2020 Order of Merit.

The wins helped her rise to second spot in the World Amateur Golf Ranking, behind American Rose Zhang.

In the summer of 2021 she won the European Ladies Amateur Championship in Italy, 3 strokeas ahead of Alexandra Försterling. In 2022, Lindblad had a spectacular spring as a junior at LSU, winning four out of the first five tournaments of the year. She won the SEC Women's Individual Championship by sinking a 38-foot putt for eagle on the final hole. Lindblad posted a 2-0-1 record in team match play to help LSU win its first team league title in 30 years. Reaching nine career LSU wins, she topped Jenny Lidback's previous record of seven set in the 1985–86 season.

Lindblad was runner-up at the 2022 Augusta National Women's Amateur, one stroke behind winner Anna Davis.

At the 2022 U.S. Women's Open at the Pine Needles Lodge and Golf Club in Southern Pines, North Carolina, Lindblad finished leading amateur at tied 11th. Her first round of 6 under par 65, playing together with Annika Sörenstam and with Sophie Gustafson on the bag, was the lowest round ever by an amateur in the U.S. Women's Open and the second lowest round by a European player in the history of the championship. She also beat the amateur scoring records over 36 and 54 holes and tied the 72-hole amateur record in the tournament. Her putting performance was especially noticed, as she holed 66 of 69 putts inside 10 feet and every one of 50 putts from 5 feet or less during the tournament.

She accepted an invitation to the 2022 Volvo Car Scandinavian Mixed, hosted jointly by the European Tour and Ladies European Tour and held at Halmstad Golf Club, a former Solheim Cup venue in her home town. Men and women played from different tees and Lindblad finished tied 7th among the women and tied 33rd overall.

In August 2022, Lindblad was part of the Swedish team winning the World Amateur Team Championship for the Espirito Santo Trophy, beating team United States, with the better tie-breaking non-counting score.

Amateur wins
2015 Junior Masters Invitational, Jönköping Junior Open by FJ
2017 Irish Girls U18 Open Stroke Play Championship, Stenson Sunesson Junior Challenge, Swedish Junior Classics, Bokskogen Junior Open
2018 German Girls Open, Jönköping Junior Open
2019 Annika Invitational USA, Teen Tour Elite #1, Magnolia Invitational
2020 Florida State Match Up
2021 Liz Murphey Collegiate Classic, LSU Tiger Golf Classic, European Ladies Amateur Championship, Jackson T. Stephens Cup
2022 Moon Golf Invitational, Clover Cup, Clemson Invitational, SEC Women's Golf Championship

Source:

Professional wins (2)

Nordic Golf Tour (2)

Results in LPGA majors

CUT = missed the half-way cut
NT = no tournament
T = tied

Team appearances
Amateur
Junior Ryder Cup (representing Europe): 2018
Junior Golf World Cup (representing Sweden): 2018
European Girls' Team Championship (representing Sweden): 2018
European Ladies' Team Championship (representing Sweden): 2019 (winners), 2020 (winners), 2021, 2022
Arnold Palmer Cup (representing the International Team): 2020 (winners), 2021
Espirito Santo Trophy (representing Sweden): 2022 (winners)

Source:

References

External links

Swedish female golfers
Amateur golfers
LSU Lady Tigers golfers
Sportspeople from Halland County
Sportspeople from Halmstad
2000 births
Living people